Santana is an American rock band, formed in 1966 by American guitarist Carlos Santana, which has performed for five decades.

The group's first concert tours were North America, with performances in Europe, where they performed at small and medium-size venues and rock festivals. Following a lineup change in early 1972, they toured the world from 1972 to 1973. During this tour, the band performed at arenas and theaters, while doing several concerts in South America, one of the first tours of the continent by a major American rock act. After a North American tour in 1974, the last remaining members of the group from their famous lineup, Michael Shrieve and José Areas, quit the group, and the band underwent multiple lineup changes during the following years. In the 1970s to the 1980s, the band played at arenas, but mostly theaters and seldom music festivals.

In the 1990s, the group lost their recording contract, but they continued to tour extensively throughout the decade, mostly playing at theaters and amphitheaters. However, the band ended the decade with the Supernatural Tour, a vehicle for their popular 1999 album Supernatural. The 177–date tour was a success with audiences and critics, and the group continued to perform within the 2000s. In the third quarter of 2010, Carlos Santana proposed to drummer Cindy Blackman after her solo on the song "Corazón Espinado", and she became an official member of the band in 2016. The group continues to tour the world to this day.

1967-68 performances (1967–1968) 

Santana, then known as the Santana Blues Band, performed in 1967 and 1968 in many line-ups throughout the West Coast of the United States.

History 
In January 1967, Carlos Santana was offered a slot by Bill Graham as an opener for an upcoming show at San Francisco's Fillmore Auditorium after Graham was impressed with Santana's performance with Paul Butterfield at the same venue in late January. In February 1967, his group, the Santana Blues Band, was officially formed when guitarist Tom Fraser invited Carlos Santana to jam with his friend Gregg Rolie, after seeing Santana play with Butterfield at the Fillmore. The band's first performance was on March 1, 1967 at The Ark club located inside a converted ferry boat in Sausalito, California. At the second show on March 17 at the Winchester Cathedral in Redwood City, California, the band was paid $75 for their performance, and allegedly, future drummer Michael Shrieve was in the audience at that show.

After a hiatus due to Santana being treated for tuberculosis, the group opened for the Who at the Fillmore on June 16 and 17, 1967, but the band was blacklisted from performing at the venue due to players Sergio "Gus" Rodriguez and Danny Haro showing up late for the gig on the 17th. In July, manager Stan Marcum made Santana remove Rodriguez and Haro from the band, and Haro was replaced by Bob Wehr for one performance at the Grant & Green jazz bar, where David Brown was asked to join after the performance. In November 1967, the band changed their name to Santana.

Live releases 
Live material from these performances has appeared on the following:

 Songs from the band's shows from December 19 to 22, 1968 were released on the 1997 live album Live at the Fillmore 1968.
 A performance from 1968 was released as The Very Best of Santana – Live in 1968 in 2007.

Tour band 
 Gregg Rolie – lead vocals, Hammond organ, piano 
 Carlos Santana – lead guitar, percussion, vocals
 Tom Fraser – rhythm guitar (through August 1967)
 Sergio "Gus" Rodriguez – bass guitar (through July 1967)
 David Brown – bass guitar (beginning July 1967)
 Danny Haro – drums (through July 1967)
 Bob Wehr – drums (in July 1967)
 Rod Harper – drums (from July to November 1967)
 Bob "Doc" Livingston – drums (beginning November 1967)
 Michael Carabello – congas, percussion (to July 1967)
 Marcus Malone – congas, percussion (beginning July 1967)

Set list 
The group's set list usually consisted of covers of Latin music and blues songs, such as Willie Bobo's "Fried Neckbones and Some Homefries" and Chico Hamilton's "Conquistadore Rides Again." The set list of the live album Live at the Fillmore 1968 consists of the following:

 "Jingo" (Babatunde Olatunji)
 "Persuasion" (Gregg Rolie)
 "Treat" (Carlos Santana, Rolie, David Brown)
 "Chunk a Funk" (Santana, Rolie)
 "Fried Neckbones and Some Homefries" (Willie Bobo, Melvin Lastie)
 "Conquistadore Rides Again" (Chico Hamilton)
 "Soul Sacrifice" (Santana, Rolie, Marcus Malone, Brown)
 "As the Years Go Passing By" (Deadric Malone)
 "Freeway" (Santana, Rolie)

Performance dates

Notes

Santana Tour (1969–1970) 

The Santana Tour was the first concert tour by the American rock band Santana, promoting their self-titled debut album.

History 
1969 marked the first year Santana entered the mainstream, thanks to the group's appearance at the Woodstock festival, where drummer Michael Shrieve, aged 20, was one of the youngest musicians to play at the festival, and the success of their self-titled debut album. They performed nearly non-stop in the United States during that year, appearing at several large music festivals such as the Texas International Pop Festival and the Altamont Speedway Free Festival. During that year, the group's lineup was finalized, Carlos Santana on guitar, percussion, and vocals, David Brown on bass guitar, Gregg Rolie on Hammond organ and lead vocals, Michael Carabello on congas, José Areas on timbales, congas, and trumpet, and Shrieve on drums. In 1970, the group toured Europe (as well as playing at the Bath Festival of Blues and Progressive Music) and they played in Canada for the first time.

Live releases 
Live material from this tour has appeared on a number of different releases:

 The group's set at the Woodstock festival on August 16, 1969 has appeared on the following releases:
 The group's entire set was released on the 2008 box set The Woodstock Experience.
 The group's whole set at the festival (minus "Evil Ways") was released on the 2004 Legacy Edition of Santana.
 "Savor", "Soul Sacrifice", and "Fried Neck Bones and Some Homefries" was released on the 1998 reissue of Santana.
 "Persuasion" and "Soul Sacrifice" was released on the 1988 compilation album Viva Santana!.
 "Soul Sacrifice" saw release on the 1988 video Viva Santana! An Intimate Conversation With Carlos Santana. Additionally, the same song was released on the 1995 box set Dance of the Rainbow Serpent, the 1970 live album Woodstock: Music from the Original Soundtrack and More, and the 1970 film Woodstock.
 "Incident at Neshabur", "Soul Sacrifice", and "A Super Jam!" (with the Grateful Dead and Jefferson Airplane) from the show on February 4, 1970 was released on the 2005 video A Night at the Family Dog. Plus, "Incident at Neshabur" was released on the video Viva Santana! An Intimate Conversation With Carlos Santana.
 The band's performance in London on April 18, 1970 has appeared on the following releases:
 "Se a Cabo", "Toussaint L'Overture", "Black Magic Woman", and "Gypsy Queen" were released on the 1998 remastered edition of Abraxas.
 "Gumbo" and "Soul Sacrifice" were released on the 2001 video Legends of Rock: Live in Concert at the Royal Albert Hall.
 "Gumbo", "Savor", and "Jin-go-lo-ba" from the band's performance at the Kralingen Music Festival in the Netherlands was released on the 1971 film Stamping Ground and the live album of the same name.

Tour band 
 Gregg Rolie – lead vocals, Hammond organ, piano, percussion
 Carlos Santana – guitar, percussion, backing vocals
 David Brown – bass guitar
 Bob "Doc" Livingston – drums (through March 15, 1969)
 Johnny Rae – drums (from March 21, 1969 to April 5, 1969)
 Michael Shrieve – drums (beginning April 1969)
 Marcus Malone – congas, percussion (through January 17, 1969)
 Michael Carabello – congas, percussion (beginning February 11, 1969)
 José Areas – timbales, congas, percussion, trumpet (beginning May 3, 1969)

Typical set lists

January 1969–April 1970: North American tour 
Known as the Santana Blues Band up around March 1969, the band performed extensively during this tour, playing at mostly high schools, colleges, clubs, small music venues, fairgrounds, and large rock festivals such as Woodstock throughout. The tour began at January 10, 1969 at The TNT in Olympic Valley, California and ended on April 12, 1970 at the Fillmore East in New York City. A typical set list from 1969 was as follows (all songs written by the members of Santana unless specified otherwise).

 "Waiting" (Carlos Santana)
 "Evil Ways" (Clarence "Sonny" Henry)
 "Savor"
 "Treat"
 "You Just Don't Care"
 "Jin-go-lo-ba" (Babatunde Olatunji)
 "Persuasion"
 "Soul Sacrifice" (Santana, Gregg Rolie, David Brown, Marcus Malone)

A typical set list from 1970 (all songs written by the members of Santana unless specified otherwise) was as follows (actual set list taken from the first or second show on April 12):

 "Se Acabó" (José Areas)
 "Black Magic Woman" (Peter Green)
 "Gypsy Queen" (Gábor Szabó)
 "Savor"
 "Jin-go-lo-ba" (Olatunji)
 "Oye Como Va" (Tito Puente)
 "Hope You're Feeling Better" (Rolie)
 "Toussaint L'Overture"
 "Evil Ways" (Henry)
 "Persuasion"
 "Soul Sacrifice" (Santana, Rolie, Brown, Malone)
 "Treat"

April 1970: One show in England 
On April 18, 1970, the band did one show in England for The Sound of the Seventies festival at the Royal Albert Hall in London, their first show in Europe and their first show outside North America. These are the songs known to have been performed there are (all songs written by the members of Santana unless specified otherwise):

 "Se Acabó" (Areas)
 "Toussaint L'Overture"
 "Black Magic Woman" (Green)
 "Gypsy Queen" (Szabó)
 "Gumbo" (Santana, Rolie)
 "Soul Sacrifice" (Santana, Rolie, Brown, Malone)

April–June 1970: Second North American tour 
A short North American tour followed the gig in England, lasting from April 24, 1970 at the Memorial Hall in Allentown, Pennsylvania and ending on June 13, 1970 at the Capitol Theatre in Port Chester, New York. Taken from the show on May 22 at the Waikiki Shell in Honolulu, a typical set list from this tour was as follows (all songs written by the members of Santana unless specified otherwise):

 "Se Acabó" (Areas)
 "Black Magic Woman" (Green)
 "Gypsy Queen" (Szabó)
 "Savor"
 "Jin-go-lo-ba" (Olatunji)
 "Oye Como Va" (Puente)
 "Toussaint L'Overture"
 "Evil Ways" (Henry)
 "Treat"
 "Gumbo" (Santana, Rolie)
 "Waiting" (Santana)
 "Hope You're Feeling Better" (Rolie)
 "Conquistadore Rides Again" (Chico Hamilton)

June 1970: European tour 
The group embarked on a short, 8-date European tour in June 1970, which commenced on June 16, 1970 at the Royal Albert Hall in London, England and concluded on June 28, 1970 at the Bath Festival of Blues and Progressive Music at the Royal Bath and West Showground in Shepton Mallet, England. This set list is representative of the show on June 28. It does not represent all concerts for the duration of the tour.

All songs written by the members of Santana unless specified otherwise.

 "Se Acabó" (Areas)
 "Black Magic Woman" (Green)
 "Gypsy Queen" (Szabó)
 "Savor"
 "Jin-go-lo-ba" (Olatunji)
 "Oye Como Va" (Puente)
 "Incident at Neshabur" (Alberto Gianquinto, Santana)
 "Toussaint L'Overture"
 "Evil Ways" (Henry)
 "Persuasion"
 "Soul Sacrifice" (Santana, Rolie, Brown, Malone)
 "Gumbo" (Santana, Rolie)

Tour dates

North American leg (January 10, 1969 – April 12, 1970)

U.K. show (April 18, 1970)

North American leg (April 24 – June 13, 1970)

European leg (June 16–28, 1970)

Notes

Abraxas Tour (1970–1971) 

The Abraxas Tour was the second concert tour by American rock band Santana.

History 
This tour was the first of two to feature guitarist Neal Schon. Schon joined the group in December 1970 after declining an invitation to be a part of Derek and the Dominos. The band now boasted a powerful dual-lead-guitar act that gave their music a tougher sound. In January 1971, drugs were becoming a problem in the group, so Carlos Santana spoke to Michael Carabello about this problem, but it would be a long time before they fixed it. Around the same time, José Areas was stricken with a near-fatal brain hemorrhage, and Santana hoped to continue by finding a temporary replacement (Willie Bobo played with the group for the sole African concert), while others in the band, especially Michael Carabello, felt it was wrong to perform publicly without Areas. Cliques formed, and the band started to disintegrate. In March 1971, Coke Escovedo joined the group, and these problems plagued the group into the start of the next tour.

Live releases 
Live material from this tour has appeared on a number of different releases:

 "Toussaint L'Overture" and "Evil Ways" from the concert on August 18, 1970 in Lenox, Massachusetts were released on the 1988 video Viva Santana! An Intimate Conversation With Carlos Santana.
 "Jungle Strut", "Waiting", "Black Magic Woman", and "Gypsy Queen" from the show on March 6, 1971 in Ghana were released on the 1971 film Soul to Soul.

Reception 
Billboard described one of the band's shows on August 10, 1970 at the Fillmore East in New York City as "exciting."

Tour band 
 Gregg Rolie – lead vocals, Hammond organ, piano, percussion
 Carlos Santana – guitar, percussion, vocals
 Neal Schon – guitar
 David Brown – bass guitar
 Michael Shrieve – drums
 Michael Carabello – percussion, vocals
 José ”Chepito” Areas – timbales, congas, percussion, trumpet (on all dates but March 6, 1971)
 Willie Bobo – percussion (on March 6, 1971)
 Coke Escovedo – timbales, percussion (beginning on March 20, 1971)

Typical set lists 
This is a usual set list of the group's concerts in 1970 (actual set list taken from the August 18 Lenox show):

All songs written by the members of Santana unless otherwise specified.

 "Batuka" (José Areas, David Brown, Michael Carabello, Gregg Rolie, Michael Shrieve)
 "Se Acabó" (Areas)
 "Black Magic Woman" (Peter Green)
 "Gypsy Queen" (Gábor Szabó)
 "Oye Como Va" (Tito Puente)
 "Incident at Neshabur" (Alberto Gianquinto, Carlos Santana)
 "Toussaint L'Overture"
 "Evil Ways" (Clarence "Sonny" Henry)
 "Hope You're Feeling Better" (Rolie)
 "Treat"
 "Savor"
 "Jin-go-lo-ba" (Babatunde Olatunji
 "Soul Sacrifice" (Santana, Rolie, Brown, Marcus Malone)
 "Gumbo" (Santana, Rolie)
 "Persuasion"

This is an average set list of the group's performances in 1971 (actual set list taken from the March 23 Inglewood show):

 "Waiting"
 "Ballin'" (Carlos Santana, Gregg Rolie)
 "Black Magic Woman" (Peter Green)
 "Gypsy Queen" (Gábor Szabó)
 "Oye Como Va" (Tito Puente)
 "Samba Pa Ti" (Santana)
 "Toussaint L'Overture"
 "Evil Ways" (Clarence "Sonny" Henry)
 "Incident at Neshabur" (Gianquinto, Santana)
 "Jungle Strut" (Gene Ammons)
 "Everybody's Everything" (Santana, Milton Brown, Tyrone Moss)
 "Gumbo" (Santana, Rolie)
 "Black Magic Woman (Reprise)" (Green)
 "Oye Como Va (Reprise)" (Puente)
 "Guajira" (José Areas, David Brown, Rico Reyes)

Tour dates

North American leg (August 4, 1970 – January 1, 1971)

Ghanaian show (March 6, 1971)

U.S. leg (March 20 – April 3, 1971)

European leg (April 14 – May 9, 1971)

Notes

Santana III Tour (1971) 

The Santana III Tour was the third concert tour by American rock band Santana in 1971, supporting their album Santana, commonly known as Santana III.

History 
This tour was a rather unfavorable one for Santana. Due to David Brown's severe heroin use, he was replaced by Tom Rutley in August. In late September, due to an argument, the group toured without Carlos Santana, which Santana dismissed the group minus him as a "Santana tribute". In mid-October, Santana returned to the band, and Michael Carabello was taken out of the group. Santana returned because during a series of shows in New York City, the group was booed because Santana wasn't playing with them. An audience member from one of these shows, Mingo Lewis was chosen to play with the group in the meantime.

A South American tour was cut short in Lima, Peru in December. The group was supposed to perform on December 11 at the Estadio Universidad Nacional Mayor San Marcos in Lima, but they were deported back to the United States due to student protests against U.S. governmental policies. Even if around five million soles were sold in tickets, the concert was cancelled and its cancellation was announced on December 10 by the Minister of the Interior.

Live releases 
Live material from this tour that has seen release all comes from the group's performance at the Fillmore West in San Francisco on July 4 and has appeared on the following:

 "Incident at Neshabur" was released on the 1988 compilation album Viva Santana!.
 "Incident at Neshabur" and "In a Silent Way" was released on the 1972 live album Fillmore: The Last Days and the 1972 film Fillmore.
 "In a Silent Way" was released on the 1995 box set Dance of the Rainbow Serpent.
 "Toussaint L'Overture" was released on the 1999 compilation album Rare Rock Tracks (11 Previously Unreleased Performances).
 The group's entire set minis "Soul Sacrifice" was released on the 2006 Legacy Edition of Santana III.

Tour band 
 Gregg Rolie – lead vocals, Hammond organ, piano, percussion
 Carlos Santana – guitar, percussion, vocals (from June 10 to September 24, returning mid-October)
 Neal Schon – guitar
 Michael Shrieve – drums
 David Brown – bass guitar (through July 18)
 Tom Rutley – bass guitar (beginning September 16)
 José ”Chepito” Areas – timbales, congas, percussion, trumpet
 Michael Carabello – congas, percussion, vocals (through July 18)
 Coke Escovedo – timbales, percussion (through October 12)
 James ”Mingo” Lewis – congas, percussion (beginning mid-October)

Set list 
This is a usual set list of this tour (actual set list taken from the September 28 Denver show):

 "Batuka" (José Areas, David Brown, Michael Carabello, Gregg Rolie, Michael Shrieve)
 "No One to Depend On" (Carabello, Coke Escovedo, Rolie, Willie Bobo, Melvin Lastie)
 "Taboo" (Areas, Rolie)
 "Se Acabó" (Areas)
 "Waiting" (Carlos Santana)
 "Incident at Neshabur" (Alberto Gianquinto, Santana)
 "Black Magic Woman" (Peter Green)
 "Gypsy Queen" (Gábor Szabó)
 "Oye Como Va" (Tito Puente)
 "In a Silent Way" (Joe Zawinul)
 "Marbles" (John McLaughlin)
 "Toussaint L'Overture" (Areas, Brown, Carabello, Rolie, Santana, Shrieve)
 "Evil Ways" (Clarence "Sonny" Henry)
 "Para los Rumberos" (Puente)
 "Soul Sacrifice" (Santana, Rolie, Brown, Marcus Malone)

Tour dates

U.S. leg (June 10 – September 18)

Brazilian show (September 24)

North American leg (September 28 – December 6)

Canceled South American leg (December 11)

Box office score data

Caravanserai Tour (1972–1973) 

The Caravanserai Tour was a series of performances by American Latin rock band Santana in support of their album Caravanserai during 1972 and 1973. It started on September 4, 1972, at the Erie Canal Soda Pop Festival in Griffin, Indiana, and ended on October 21, 1973 at Ginasio Municipal Novo in Brasília, Brazil. This tour could be considered to be the group's most eclectic tour at this point, as the band did concerts at every continent except Africa and Antarctica, including one of the first, if not the first, tours of Latin America by a major American rock act.

The tour was the first and only tour to feature the group's second lineup, "The New Santana Band", consisting of guitarist Carlos Santana, percussionists Armando Peraza and José Areas, bassist Doug Rauch, drummer Michael Shrieve, and Tom Coster and Richard Kermode on keyboards. The group often performed material from Caravanserai along with other improvisations and covers.

Some concerts were recorded and filmed and released as albums and films. The shows on July 3 and 4, 1973 at the Osaka Kōsei Nenkin Kaikan in Osaka, Japan were released as the triple vinyl LP Lotus (1974). Select concerts during the tour's Latin American portion were filmed and incorporated into the documentary, Santana en Colores (1973).

Welcome Tour (1973–1974) 

The Welcome Tour was a concert tour by Santana promoting their album, Welcome. The tour began on November 13, 1973 at Colston Hall in Bristol, England and ended on October 29, 1974 at the William P. Cole, Jr. Student Activities Building in College Park, Maryland.

Borboletta Tour (1974–1975) 

The Borboletta Tour was the sixth concert tour by American rock band Santana in 1974 and 1975 in support of their album Borboletta.

History 
After a performance in Honolulu, Hawaii, Santana toured Japan in November–December 1974. After the conclusion of the Japanese tour, the group performed extensively in North America from March to September 1975 with Eric Clapton and his band. Then, the band toured with Earth, Wind & Fire in Europe. The European tour is notable as the group played two shows in Yugoslavia on October 4 and 5, 1975, their first performances behind the Iron Curtain.

The singer of the opening act for the show at the Beacon Theatre in New York City on April 11, 1975, Alex Ligertwood of Tone, influenced Carlos Santana to enroll him into Santana in 1979 because he was enamored by his performance.

Tour band 
 Leon Patillo – lead vocals, piano, organ (through November 15, 1975)
 Greg Walker – lead vocals, percussion (beginning December 4, 1975)
 Carlos Santana – guitar, percussion, vocals
 Tom Coster – Yamaha organ, Hammond organ, Minimoog, electric piano, percussion, vocals
 David Brown – bass guitar
 Leon "Ndugu" Chancler – drums
 Armando Peraza – congas, percussion

Typical set lists

November–December 1974: Asian tour 
After a show in Hawaii, the group embarked on 16-date tour of Japan, starting on November 23, 1974 at Kanazawa City Tourism Center in Kanazawa, and ending on December 14, 1974 in Fukuoka Kyuden Kinen Gymnasium in Fukuoka. This is a usual set list for this leg (actual set list taken from the December 3 Yokohama show):

 "Going Home" (Anton Dvorák; arranged by Alice Coltrane, Carlos Santana, Tom Coster, Richard Kermode, Doug Rauch, Michael Shrieve, José Areas, Armando Peraza)
 "A-1 Funk" (Santana, Coster, Kermode, Rauch, Shrieve, Areas, Peraza)
 "Every Step of the Way" (Shrieve)
 "Black Magic Woman" (Peter Green)
 "Gypsy Queen" (Gábor Szabó)
 "Oye Como Va" (Tito Puente)
 "Mirage" (Leon Patillo)
 "Just in Time to See the Sun" (Gregg Rolie, Santana, Shrieve)
 "Bambele" (Areas, Peraza)
 "Xibaba (She-Ba-Ba)" (Airto Moreira)
 "Give and Take" (Santana, Coster, Shrieve)
 "Incident at Neshabur" (Alberto Gianquinto, Santana)
 "Soul Sacrifice" (Santana, Rolie, David Brown, Marcus Malone)
 "Samba Pa Ti" (Santana)
 "Savor" (Areas, Brown, Michael Carabello, Rolie, Santana, Shrieve)
 "Toussaint L'Ouverture" (Areas, Brown, Carabello, Rolie, Santana, Shrieve)

March–September 1975: First North American tour 
This tour began on March 23, 1975 with a benefit concert for the San Francisco school system at Kezar Stadium before at least 60,000 people, and stopped on September 1, 1975 at Oakland–Alameda County Coliseum in Oakland, California. A common set list for this tour was as follows (actual set list from the early May 29 Toronto concert):

 "Incident at Neshabur" (Gianquinto, Santana)
 "Black Magic Woman" (Green)
 "Gypsy Queen" (Szabó)
 "Oye Como Va" (Puente)
 "Let the Music Set You Free" (Coster, Patillo, David Rubinson, Santana)
 "Time Waits for No One" (Mick Jagger, Keith Richards)
 "Give and Take" (Santana, Coster, Shrieve)
 "Samba Pa Ti" (Santana)
 "Mirage" (Leon Patillo)
 "Savor" (Areas, Brown, Michael Carabello, Rolie, Santana, Shrieve)
 "Toussaint L'Ouverture" (Areas, Brown, Carabello, Rolie, Santana, Shrieve)
 "Soul Sacrifice" (Santana, Rolie, Brown, Malone)

September–October 1975: European tour 
This tour lasted from September 5, 1975 at the Birmingham Hippodrome in Birmingham, England to October 13, 1975 at the Pavillon de Paris in Paris, France. The most complete set list of this leg is from September 14 at the [Palace Manchester] in Manchester, England.

 "Incident at Neshabur" (Gianquinto, Santana)
 "Black Magic Woman" (Green)
 "Gypsy Queen" (Szabó)
 "Oye Como Va" (Puente)
 "Let the Music Set You Free" (Coster, Patillo, David Rubinson, Santana)
 "Time Waits for No One" (Mick Jagger, Keith Richards)
 "Samba Pa Ti" (Santana)
 "Savor" (Areas, Brown, Michael Carabello, Rolie, Santana, Shrieve)
 "Toussaint L'Ouverture" (Areas, Brown, Carabello, Rolie, Santana, Shrieve)
 "Soul Sacrifice" (Santana, Rolie, Brown, Malone)

November–December 1975: Second North American tour 
This brief tour of the United States commenced on November 14, 1975 at San Francisco's Winterland Ballroom and concluded on December 31, 1975 at the Cow Palace in Daly City, California. The only set list of this tour available is the New Year's Eve gig.

 "Incident at Neshabur" (Gianquinto, Santana)
 "Black Magic Woman" (Green)
 "Gypsy Queen" (Szabó)
 "Oye Como Va" (Puente)
 "Tell Me Are You Tired" (Leon "Ndugu" Chancler, Coster)
 "Time Waits for No One" (Jagger, Richards)
 "Samba Pa Ti" (Santana)
 "Give and Take" (Santana, Coster, Shrieve)
 "Savor" (Areas, Brown, Michael Carabello, Rolie, Santana, Shrieve)
 "Toussaint L'Ouverture" (Areas, Brown, Carabello, Rolie, Santana, Shrieve)
 "Let Me" (Coster, Santana)
 "Soul Sacrifice" (Santana, Rolie, Brown, Malone)

Tour dates

North American show (November 16, 1974)

Japanese leg (November 23 – December 14, 1974)

North American leg (March 23 – September 1, 1975)

European leg (September 5 – October 13, 1975)

U.S. leg (November 14 – December 31, 1975)

Notes

Pacific Tour '76 (1976) 

Santana Pacific Tour '76 was the seventh concert tour of countries bordering the Pacific Ocean in February and March 1976 by Santana.

Overview 
This was a short, five-week tour of countries located in the Southern Hemisphere. It consisted of a tour of Australia and New Zealand and a tour of Japan. The tour began on 1 February 1976 with a performance at Carlaw Park in Auckland, New Zealand and ended on 17 March 1976 with a concert at Tsukisamu Dome in Sapporo, Japan. The Oceanic concerts were promoted by Paul Dainty Corporation, while the Japanese shows were promoted by Udo Concerts.

Tour band 
 Greg Walker – lead vocals
 Carlos Santana – electric guitar, Latin percussion, vocals
 Tom Coster – Yamaha organ, Hammond organ, Minimoog, electric piano, keyboards, percussion, vocals
 David Brown – bass guitar
 Leon "Ndugu" Chancler – drums
 Armando Peraza – congas, percussion, vocals

Set list 
This is an average set list of this tour:

 "Incident at Neshabur" (Carlos Santana, Alberto Gianquinto)
 "Black Magic Woman" (Peter Green)
 "Gypsy Queen" (Gábor Szabó)
 "Oye Como Va" (Tito Puente)
 "Let It Shine" (David Brown, Ray Gardner)
 "Europa (Earth's Cry Heaven's Smile)" (Tom Coster, Santana)
 "Dance Sister Dance (Baila Mi Hermana)" (Leon "Ndugu" Chancler, Coster, David Rubinson)
 "Give and Take" (Santana, Coster, Michael Shrieve)
 "Samba Pa Ti" (Santana)
 "Savor" (José "Chepito" Areas, Brown, Michael Carabello, Gregg Rolie, Santana, Shrieve)
 "Toussaint L'Overture" (Areas, Brown, Carabello, Rolie, Shrieve, Carlos Santana)
 "Let Me" (Coster, Santana)
 "Soul Sacrifice" (Santana, Rolie, Brown, Marcus Malone)

Tour dates

Oceanic leg (February 1–17)

Japanese leg (February 20 – March 17)

Amigos Tour (1976) 

The Amigos Tour was the eighth concert tour by Santana supporting their album Amigos.

History 
The band spent most of 1976 supporting Amigos by embarking on a tour of the United States and Canada followed by a series of concerts in Europe, with the group finishing the year with a New Year's Eve concert at San Francisco's Winterland Ballroom. Lineup changes were frequent during this tour: David Brown left and he was replaced by Bryon Miller. However, Miller was replaced by Pablo Tellez around the same time as Leon "Ndugu" Chancler was replaced by Gaylord Birch. Armando Peraza was replaced by Raul Rekow and José "Chepito" Areas. Finally, Birch was replaced by Graham Lear, and Greg Walker was replaced by Luther Rabb for the European tour. The only consistent members of the entire tour were Tom Coster and Carlos Santana.

Reception 
In a review of the band's show at New York City's Beacon Theatre on May 7, 1976, music critic John Rockwell described the concert as "unsuccessful." He stated that the gig had a poor sound system, and the music played at the performance was "faceless, Latin‐flavored jazz rock." On the hand, Robert Ford Jr. gave the concert a more positive review in Billboard.

Live releases 
Live material from this tour has appeared on the following releases:

 Songs from different performances during the European tour were released on the 1977 album Moonflower. This is a list of songs from the album that were taken from a show during this leg:
 "Carnaval", "Let the Children Play", and "Jugando" from the show on December 2 at Olympiahalle in Munich, West Germany.
 "Savor" and "Toussaint L'Overture" from the gig on December 4 at the Théâtre de Plein Air in Colmar, France.
 "Black Magic Woman", "Gypsy Queen", "Dance Sister Dance (Baila Mi Hermana)", and "Europa (Earth's Cry Heaven's Smile)" from the performance on December 5 at the Pavillon de Paris in Paris, France.
 "Soul Sacrifice" and "Head, Hands & Feet" from the concert on December 15 at the Hammersmith Odeon in London, England.
 Additionally, "Europa (Earth's Cry Heaven's Smile)" was also featured on the 1988 video Viva Santana! An Intimate Conversation With Carlos Santana.

Tour band 
 Greg Walker – lead vocals, percussion (through June 5)
 Luther Rabb – lead vocals, percussion (beginning November 5)
 Carlos Santana – guitar, percussion, vocals
 Tom Coster – Yamaha organ, Hammond organ, Minimoog, electric piano, keyboards, percussion, vocals
 Byron Miller – bass guitar (through June 5)
 Pablo Tellez – bass guitar, vocals (beginning July 2)
 Leon "Ndugu" Chancler – drums (through June 5)
 Gaylord Birch – drums (from July 2 to August 25)
 Graham Lear – drums (beginning November 5)
 Armando Peraza – congas, percussion (through June 5)
 Francisco Aguabella – percussion (on June 5)
 Raul Rekow – congas, bongos, percussion, vocals (beginning July 2)
 José ”Chepito” Areas – timbales, congas, percussion, vocals (beginning July 2)

Typical set lists

March–August: North American tour 
This tour began with a performance on March 20 at Sun Devil Stadium in Tempe, Arizona intended for the filming of A Star Is Born, and concluded with a gig on August 25 at the Schaefer Music Festival in Central Park's Wollman Rink. Here is a typical set list for this leg (actual set list taken from the May 8 Boston show):

 "Black Magic Woman" (Peter Green)
 "Gypsy Queen" (Gábor Szabó)
 "Dance Sister Dance (Baila Mi Hermana)" (Leon "Ndugu" Chancler, Tom Coster, David Rubinson)
 "Europa (Earth's Cry Heaven's Smile)" (Tom Coster, Carlos Santana)
 "Let It Shine" (David Brown, Ray Gardner)
 "Oye Como Va" (Tito Puente)
 "Samba Pa Ti" (Santana)
 "Savor" (José "Chepito" Areas, Brown, Michael Carabello, Gregg Rolie, Santana, Michael Shrieve)
 "Toussaint L'Overture" (Areas, Brown, Carabello, Rolie, Shrieve, Santana)
 "Let Me" (Coster, Santana)
 "Soul Sacrifice" (Santana, Rolie, Brown, Marcus Malone)
 "Incident at Neshabur" (Santana, Alberto Gianquinto)
 "Evil Ways" (Clarence "Sonny" Henry)

November–December: European tour 
This tour started on November 5 at Empire Pool in London, England, and ended on December 16 at an unknown venue in Lugano, Switzerland. Here is a typical set list for this leg (actual set list taken from the December 5 Paris show):

 "Carnaval" (Coster, Santana)
 "Let the Children Play" (Leon Patillo, Santana)
 "Jugando" (Areas, Santana)
 "Black Magic Woman" (Green)
 "Gypsy Queen" (Szabó)
 "Dance Sister Dance (Baila Mi Hermana)" (Chancler, Coster, Rubinson)
 "Samba Pa Ti" (Santana)
 "Savor" (Areas, Brown, Carabello, Rolie, Santana, Shrieve)
 "Toussaint L'Overture" (Areas, Brown, Carabello, Rolie, Shrieve, Santana)
 "Revelations" (Coster, Santana)
 "Incident at Neshabur" (Santana, Gianquinto)
 "Oye Como Va" (Puente)
 "Let the Music Set You Free" (Coster, Patillo, Rubinson, Santana)
 "María Caracóles" (Pello el Afrokán)
 "Europa (Earth's Cry Heaven's Smile)" (Coster, Santana)
 "Soul Sacrifice" (Santana, Rolie, Brown, Malone)

Tour dates

North American leg (March 20 – August 25)

European leg (November 5 – December 16)

U.S. show (December 31)

Box office score data

Notes

Festivál Tour (1977) 

The Festivál Tour was the ninth concert tour by Santana supporting their album Festivál.

History 
Following the release of Festivál in January 1977, the group embarked on a tour of North America, followed by a 17-date European tour. Lineup changes weren't as common as the last tour, but some members came and went throughout this tour. Greg Walker came back, replacing Luther Rabb in January, and bassist David Margen and percussionist Pete Escovedo took over from Pablo Tellez and José "Chepito" Areas respectively in June. During the tour, Carlos Santana cancelled shows to reconcile with his wife Deborah. Bill Graham booked the band to perform at New York City's Radio City Music Hall during this tour, but the concerts were cancelled when Santana told Graham he needed time to settle with his wife. A show in Milan, Italy at Velodromo Vigorelli on September 14, 1977 was interrupted by leftist protesters in the beginning.

Live releases 
Live material from this tour has appeared on the following releases:

 The group's concert with Spanish flamenco guitarist Paco de Lucía from August 19 or August 21 was released on the video Light and Shade in 2001.
 "Song of the Wind" from the show on August 23 or August 24 at the Arènes de Fréjus in Fréjus, France was released on the 1988 compilation album Viva Santana!. It was mislabeled on the album as being from a show in Paris.

Tour band 
 Greg Walker – lead vocals, percussion
 Carlos Santana – guitar, percussion, vocals
 Tom Coster – Yamaha organ, Hammond organ, Minimoog, electric piano, keyboards, percussion, vocals
 Pablo Tellez – bass guitar, vocals (through April 24)
 David Margen – bass guitar (beginning June 29)
 Graham Lear – drums
 José "Chepito" Areas – timbales, congas, percussion, vocals (through April 24)
 Raul Rekow – congas, bongos, percussion, vocals
 Pete Escovedo – timbales, percussion (beginning June 29)

Reception 
The concert on January 30, 1977 at the Long Beach Arena in Long Beach, California was praised by Billboard.

Typical set lists

January–July: North American tour 
This leg began with a concert on January 25 at Robertson Gymnasium in Santa Barbara, California, and ended with a performance on July 9 at Seattle's Seattle Center Coliseum. Here is a typical set list for this leg (actual set list taken from the March 6 Hempstead show):

 "Carnaval" (Tom Coster, Carlos Santana)
 "Let the Children Play" (Leon Patillo, Santana)
 "Jugando" (José "Chepito" Areas, Santana)
 "Black Magic Woman" (Peter Green)
 "Gypsy Queen" (Gábor Szabó)
 "Dance Sister Dance (Baila Mi Hermana)" (Leon "Ndugu" Chancler, Coster, David Rubinson)
 "Europa (Earth's Cry Heaven's Smile)" (Coster, Santana)
 "Oye Como Va" (Tito Puente) 
 "Incident at Neshabur" (Santana, Alberto Gianquinto)
 "Let Me" (Coster, Santana)
 "Give Me Love" (Pablo Tellez)
 "Savor" (Areas, Brown, Carabello, Rolie, Santana, Shrieve)
 "Conga Solo" (Raul Rekow)
 "Toussaint L'Overture" (Areas, Brown, Carabello, Rolie, Shrieve, Santana)
 "Soul Sacrifice" (Santana, Rolie, Brown, Marcus Malone)
 "Revelations" (Coster, Santana)
 "María Caracóles" (Pello el Afrokán)
 "Samba Pa Ti" (Santana)
 "Let the Music Set You Free" (Coster, Patillo, Rubinson, Santana)
 "Transcendance" (Santana)

August–September: European tour 
This leg started on August 19 at Plaza de toros de las Arenas in Barcelona, Spain and ended on September 14 at Velodromo Vigorelli in Milan, Italy. Here is a typical set list for this leg (actual set list taken from the August 30 Bad Segeberg show):

 "El Morocco" (Coster)
 "Let the Children Play" (Patillo, Santana)
 "Jugando" (Areas, Santana)
 "Black Magic Woman" (Green)
 "Gypsy Queen" (Szabó)
 "Dance Sister Dance (Baila Mi Hermana)" (Chancler, Coster, Rubinson)
 "Europa (Earth's Cry Heaven's Smile)" (Coster, Santana)
 "I'll Be Waiting" (Santana) 
 "Oye Como Va" (Puente) 
 "Samba Pa Ti" (Santana)
 "She's Not There" (Rod Argent)
 "Savor" (Areas, David Brown, Michael Carabello, Gregg Rolie, Santana, Michael Shrieve)
 "Toussaint L'Overture" (Areas, Brown, Carabello, Rolie, Shrieve, Santana)
 "Flor d'Luna (Moonflower)" (Coster) 
 "Here And Now" (Armando Peraza, Santana)
 "Soul Sacrifice" (Santana, Rolie, Brown, Malone)
 "Evil Ways" (Clarence "Sonny" Henry)
 "Transcendance" (Santana)

Tour dates

North American leg (January 25 – July 9)

European leg (August 19 – September 14)

Box office score data

Notes

Moonflower Tour (1977–1978) 

The Moonflower Tour was the tenth concert tour by Santana supporting the Moonflower album. The tour consisted of shows in small to mid-sized venues and rock festivals, as well as universities.

Live releases 
Live material from this tour has appeared on the following releases:

 On Carlos Santana's 1979 solo album Oneness: Silver Dreams - Golden Reality, every song before "Silver Dreams Golden Smiles" was recorded on December 7, 1977 at Osaka Kōsei Nenkin Kaikan in Osaka, Japan.
 "Jugando" and "Dance Sister Dance (Baila Mi Hermana)" from the performance at the California Jam II festival in Ontario, California on March 18, 1978 was featured on the live album of the same name.
 "Dance Sister Dance (Baila Mi Hermana)" from the 1988 compilation album Viva Santana! is also from the March 18 show.

Tour band 
 Greg Walker – lead vocals, percussion
 Carlos Santana – lead guitar, percussion, vocals
 Tom Coster – keyboards, synthesizer (through June 1978)
 Chris Solberg – rhythm guitar, keyboards (beginning June 1978)
 Chris Rhyne – keyboards (beginning June 1978)
 David Margen – bass guitar
 Graham Lear – drums
 Pete Escovedo – timbales, percussion
 Armando Peraza – congas, percussion, vocals
 Raul Rekow – congas, bongos, percussion, vocals

Typical set lists

November 1977: Australian shows 
The band performed twice in Australia during this tour, solely as an act of the Rockarena festival, occurring on November 11, 1977 at the Sydney Showground in Sydney and November 13 at the Calder Park Raceway in Melbourne, playing to crowds of more than 43,000 and 60,000 respectively. The November 13 gig was televised, and the songs broadcast on television were:

 "Zulu" (Tom Coster)
 "Let the Children Play" (Leon Patillo, Carlos Santana)
 "Jugando" (José Areas, Santana)
 "Black Magic Woman" (Peter Green)
 "Gypsy Queen" (Gábor Szabó)
 "Dance Sister Dance (Baila Mi Hermana)" (Leon "Ndugu" Chancler, Coster, David Rubinson)
 "Europa (Earth's Cry Heaven's Smile)" (Coster, Santana)
 "I'll Be Waiting" (Santana)
 "She's Not There" (Rod Argent)
 "Batuka" (Areas, David Brown, Michael Carabello, Gregg Rolie, Michael Shrieve)
 "No One to Depend On" (Carabello, Coke Escovedo, Rolie, Willie Bobo, Melvin Lastie)
 "Evil Ways" (Clarence "Sonny" Henry)
 "Oye Como Va" (Tito Puente)
 "Oneness" (Santana)
 "Savor" (Areas, Brown, Carabello, Rolie, Santana, Shrieve)
 "Toussaint L'Overture" (Areas, Brown, Carabello, Rolie, Shrieve, Santana) 
 "Gitano" (Armando Peraza)
 "Soul Sacrifice" (Santana, Rolie, Brown, Marcus Malone)

November–December 1977: Japanese tour 
Santana performed 25 concerts in Japan, starting on November 19, 1977 at Nakajima Sports Center in Sapporo and ending on December 16, 1977 at Kurashiki Civic Cultural Hall in Kurashiki. This is a usual set list for this series of concerts (actual set list taken from the December 9 Osaka show):

 "Arise Awake" (Santana)
 "Light Versus Darkness" (Santana)
 "Jim Jeannie" (Chico Hamilton)
 "Transformation Day" (Alan Hovhaness, Santana)
 "Victory" (Santana)
 "Incident at Neshabur" (Alberto Gianquinto, Santana)
 "Zulu" (Coster)
 "Let the Children Play" (Patillo, Santana)
 "Jugando" (Areas, Santana)
 "Black Magic Woman" (Green)
 "Gypsy Queen" (Szabó)
 "Dance Sister Dance (Baila Mi Hermana)" (Chancler, Coster, Rubinson)
 "Europa (Earth's Cry Heaven's Smile)" (Coster, Santana)
 "The River" (Patillo, Santana)
 "Batuka" (Areas, Brown, Carabello, Rolie, Shrieve)
 "No One to Depend On" (Carabello, Escovedo, Rolie, Bobo, Lastie)
 "Evil Ways" (Henry)
 "Oye Como Va" (Puente)
 "I'll Be Waiting" (Santana)
 "She's Not There" (Argent)
 "Savor" (Areas, Brown, Carabello, Rolie, Santana, Shrieve)
 "Toussaint L'Overture" (Areas, Brown, Carabello, Rolie, Shrieve, Santana) 
 "Flor d'Luna (Moonflower)" (Coster)
 "Guajira" (Areas, Brown, Rico Reyes)
 "Soul Sacrifice" (Santana, Rolie, Brown, Malone)
 "Solamente una vez" (Agustín Lara)
 "Gitano" (Peraza)
 "Concierto de Aranjuez" (Joaquín Rodrigo)
 "Oneness" (Santana)
 "Dawn" (Coster)
 "Transcendance" (Santana)
 "Samba Pa Ti" (Santana)

December 1977–October 1978: North American tour 

This tour lasted from December 31, 1977 at the Winterland Ballroom in San Francisco to October 16, 1978 at The Bottom Line in New York City. The band often performed at universities and clubs as well as large rock festivals. This set list is representative of the second show on October 16, 1978. It does not represent all concerts for the duration of the tour.

 "Marathon" (Carlos Santana)
 "Well All Right" (Norman Petty, Buddy Holly, Jerry Allison, Joe B. Mauldin) 
 "Black Magic Woman" (Peter Green)
 "Gypsy Queen" (Gábor Szabó)
 "Oye Como Va" (Tito Puente) 
 "Dance Sister Dance (Baila Mi Hermana)" (Leon "Ndugu" Chancler, Tom Coster, David Rubinson)
 "Europa (Earth's Cry Heaven's Smile)" (Coster, Santana)
 "Dealer/Spanish Rose" (Jim Capaldi/Santana)
 "Incident at Neshabur" (Alberto Gianquinto, Santana)
 "Victory" (Santana)
 "Move On" (Santana, Chris Rhyne)
 "Batuka" (Areas, Brown, Carabello, Rolie, Shrieve])
 "No One to Depend On" (Carabello, Escovedo, Rolie, Bobo, Lastie)
 "One Chain (Don't Make No Prison)" (Dennis Lambert, Brian Potter)
 "Toussaint L'Overture" (Areas, Brown, Carabello, Rolie, Shrieve, Santana)
 "She's Not There" (Argent)
 "Open Invitation" (Santana, Lambert, Potter, Greg Walker, David Margen)
 "Jungle Strut" (Gene Ammons)
 "Transcendance" (Santana)
 "Evil Ways" (Henry)

Tour dates

U.S. leg (October 8–29, 1977)

Australian leg (November 11–13, 1977)

Japanese leg (November 19 – December 16, 1977)

North American leg (December 31, 1977 – October 16, 1978)

Box office score data

Notes

European Tour 1978 (1978) 

Santana European Tour 1978 was a concert tour of Europe by Santana, supporting the just released Inner Secrets album. The opening act for all of the shows was the Devadip Orchestra, a short-lived group led by Carlos Santana. The tour started on 30 October 1978 at Wembley Arena in London, England and ended on 10 December 1978 at Marché aux Fleurs in Nice, France.

Tour band 
 Greg Walker – lead vocals, percussion
 Carlos Santana – lead guitar, percussion, vocals
 Chris Solberg – rhythm guitar, keyboards
 Chris Rhyne – keyboards
 David Margen – bass guitar
 Graham Lear – drums
 Pete Escovedo – timbales, percussion
 Armando Peraza – congas, percussion, vocals
 Raul Rekow – congas, bongos, percussion, vocals

Set list 

This set list is representative of the show on 11 November. It does not represent all concerts for the duration of the tour.

 "Marathon" (Carlos Santana)
 "Well All Right" (Norman Petty, Buddy Holly, Jerry Allison, Joe B. Mauldin) 
 "Black Magic Woman" (Peter Green)
 "Gypsy Queen" (Gábor Szabó)
 "Oye Como Va" (Tito Puente) 
 "Dance Sister Dance (Baila Mi Hermana)" (Leon "Ndugu" Chancler, Tom Coster, David Rubinson)
 "Europa (Earth's Cry Heaven's Smile)" (Coster, Santana)
 "Dealer/Spanish Rose" (Jim Capaldi/Santana)
 "Victory is Won" (Santana)
 "Move On" (Santana, Chris Rhyne) 
 "Batuka" (José "Chepito" Areas, David Brown, Michael Carabello, Gregg Rolie, Michael Shrieve)
 "No One to Depend On" (Carabello, Rolie, Coke Escovedo)
 "Life Is a Lady/Holiday" (Dennis Lambert/Santana)
 "One Chain (Don't Make No Prison)" (Lambert, Brian Potter)
 "Toussaint L'Overture" (Areas, Brown, Carabello, Rolie, Shrieve, Santana)
 "She's Not There" (Rod Argent)
 "Open Invitation" (Santana, Lambert, Potter, Greg Walker, David Margen)
 "Well All Right (Reprise)" (Petty, Holly, Allison, Mauldin)
 "Transcendance" (Santana)
 "Evil Ways" (Clarence "Sonny" Henry)

Tour dates 
The itinerary as shown inside the official Santana European Tour 1978 tour programme consisted of:

While the final dates performed were:

North American Tour 1979 (1979) 

Santana North American Tour 1979 was a North American tour by Santana, supporting their album Inner Secrets.

Tour band 
 Greg Walker – lead vocals, percussion (through April)
 Alex Ligertwood – lead vocals, rhythm guitar (beginning April)
 Carlos Santana – lead guitar, percussion, vocals
 Chris Solberg – rhythm guitar, keyboards
 Chris Rhyne – keyboards (through April)
 Alan Pasqua – keyboards (beginning April)
 David Margen – bass guitar
 Graham Lear – drums
 Raul Rekow – percussion, vocals
 Armando Peraza – percussion, vocals
 Pete Escovedo – percussion

Reception 
The concert on February 7, 1979 at the Convention Center in Anaheim, California was described as a "technically excellent, yet, surprisingly uninspiring nine-song nearly 90-minute set."

Set list 
The tour commenced on February 3 at the Paramount Theatre in Portland, Oregon and concluded on September 16, 1979 at Albuquerque Sports Stadium in Albuquerque, New Mexico. An average set list of this tour was as follows (actual set list from September 2):

 "Marathon" (Carlos Santana)
 "Well All Right" (Norman Petty, Buddy Holly, Jerry Allison, Joe B. Mauldin) 
 "All I Ever Wanted" (Alex Ligertwood, Santana, Chris Solberg)
 "Black Magic Woman" (Peter Green)
 "Gypsy Queen" (Gábor Szabó)
 "Hard Times" (Ligertwood, Margen, Alan Pasqua) - 3:57
 "Europa (Earth's Cry Heaven's Smile)" (Tom Coster, Santana)
 "Batuka" (José "Chepito" Areas, David Brown, Michael Carabello, Gregg Rolie, Michael Shrieve)
 "No One to Depend On" (Carabello, Rolie, Coke Escovedo)
 "Savor" (Areas, Brown, Carabello, Rolie, Santana, Shrieve)
 "Toussaint L'Ouverture" (Areas, Brown, Carabello, Rolie, Santana, Shrieve)
 "Aqua Marine" (Pasqua, Santana)
 "Lightning in the Sky" (Santana, Solberg)
 "Open Invitation" (Santana, Dennis Lambert, Brian Potter, Greg Walker, David Margen)
 "I Want You (She's So Heavy)" (John Lennon)
 "Drum Solo" (Graham Lear)
 "Percussion Solos" (Armando Peraza, Raul Rekow)
 "Stand Up" (Santana, Solberg)
 "Runnin" (Margen)
 "Soul Sacrifice" (Santana, Rolie, Brown, Marcus Malone)
 "She's Not There" (Rod Argent)
 "Incident at Neshabur" (Alberto Gianquinto, Santana)
 "Transcendance" (Santana)
 "Evil Ways" (Clarence "Sonny" Henry)

Tour dates

Box office score data

Notes

1979 tour of Australia, Japan and the United States (1979) 

During the last quarter of 1979, American rock band Santana toured Australia, Japan and the United States in support of their album Marathon. Eddie Money toured with the group through October 28.

Live releases 
Live material from this tour has appeared on the following releases:

 "Europa (Earth's Cry Heaven's Smile)" from October 24 at the Festival Hall in Osaka, Japan was featured on the 1988 compilation album Viva Santana!.

Tour band 
 Alex Ligertwood – lead vocals, rhythm guitar
 Carlos Santana – lead guitar, percussion, vocals
 Chris Solberg – rhythm guitar, keyboards
 Alan Pasqua – keyboards
 David Margen – bass guitar
 Graham Lear – drums
 Pete Escovedo – timbales, percussion
 Armando Peraza – congas, percussion, vocals
 Raul Rekow – congas, bongos, percussion, vocals

Reception 
The band's concert on November 25, 1979 at the Palladium in New York City was praised in a review for Billboard.

Typical set lists

Australian dates 
The Australian tour lasted from October 1 in Apollo Stadium in Adelaide to October 10 at the Hordern Pavilion in Sydney. The most complete set list is from the 8th.

 "Marathon" (Carlos Santana)
 "Well All Right" (Norman Petty, Buddy Holly, Jerry Allison, Joe B. Mauldin) 
 "All I Ever Wanted" (Alex Ligertwood, Santana, Chris Solberg)
 "Singing Winds, Crying Beasts" (Michael Carabello)
 "Black Magic Woman" (Peter Green)
 "Gypsy Queen" (Gábor Szabó)
 "Open Invitation" (Santana, Dennis Lambert, Brian Potter, Greg Walker, David Margen)
 "Europa (Earth's Cry Heaven's Smile)" (Tom Coster, Santana)
 "Batuka" (José "Chepito" Areas, David Brown, Michael Carabello, Gregg Rolie, Michael Shrieve)
 "No One to Depend On" (Carabello, Rolie, Coke Escovedo)
 "You Know That I Love You" (Ligertwood, Alan Pasqua, Santana)
 "Lightning in the Sky" (Santana, Solberg)
 "Aqua Marine" (Pasqua, Santana)
 "Stand Up" (Santana, Solberg)
 "Runnin" (Margen)
 "Soul Sacrifice" (Santana, Rolie, Brown, Marcus Malone)
 "She's Not There" (Rod Argent)
 "Transcendance" (Santana)
 "I Want You (She's So Heavy)" (John Lennon)
 "Evil Ways" (Clarence "Sonny" Henry)
 "Shake Your Moneymaker" (Elmore James)

Japanese performances 
The band performed in Japan from October 16 at Fukuoka Kyuden Kinen Gymnasium in Fukuoka to October 25 at Festival Hall in Osaka. An average set list was as follows (actual set list from October 19):

 "Marathon" (Santana)
 "Well All Right" (Petty, Holly, Allison, Mauldin) 
 "All I Ever Wanted" (Ligertwood, Santana, Solberg)
 "Tales of Kilimanjaro" (Pasqua, Armando Peraza, Raul Rekow, Santana)
 "Black Magic Woman" (Green)
 "Gypsy Queen" (Szabó)
 "Open Invitation" (Santana, Lambert, Potter, Walker, Margen)
 "Europa (Earth's Cry Heaven's Smile)" (Coster, Santana)
 "Batuka" (Areas, Brown, Carabello, Rolie, Shrieve)
 "No One to Depend On" (Carabello, Rolie, Escovedo)
 "Incident at Neshabur" (Alberto Gianquinto, Santana)
 "Lightning in the Sky" (Santana, Solberg)
 "Aqua Marine" (Pasqua, Santana)
 "Stand Up" (Santana, Solberg)
 "Runnin" (Margen)
 "Soul Sacrifice" (Santana, Rolie, Brown, Malone)
 "She's Not There" (Argent)
 "Transcendance" (Santana)
 "I Want You" (Arthur "T-Boy" Ross, Leon Ware)
 "Evil Ways" (Henry)

US tour 
This US tour commenced on October 28 at the Aloha Stadium in Honolulu and concluded on December 2 at the Fox Theatre in Atlanta. Unusually, selections from Caravanserai were performed. An average set list was as follows (taken from November 17):

 "Marathon" (Santana)
 "Well All Right" (Petty, Holly, Allison, Mauldin) 
 "All I Ever Wanted" (Ligertwood, Santana, Solberg)
 "Tales of Kilimanjaro" (Pasqua, Peraza, Rekow, Santana)
 "Black Magic Woman" (Green)
 "Gypsy Queen" (Szabó)
 "Open Invitation" (Santana, Lambert, Potter, Walker, Margen)
 "Europa (Earth's Cry Heaven's Smile)" (Coster, Santana)
 "No One to Depend On" (Carabello, Rolie, Escovedo)
 "Toussaint L'Ouverture" (Areas, Brown, Carabello, Rolie, Santana, Shrieve)
 "Aqua Marine" (Pasqua, Santana)
 "Just in Time to See the Sun" (Rolie, Santana, Shrieve)
 "Song of the Wind" (Rolie, Santana, Schon)
 "Lightning in the Sky" (Santana, Solberg)
 "Savor" (Areas, Brown, Carabello, Rolie, Santana, Shrieve)
 "Jin-go-lo-ba" (Babatunde Olatunji
 "You Know That I Love You" (Ligertwood, Pasqua, Santana)
 "Stand Up" (Santana, Solberg)
 "Runnin" (Margen)
 "Soul Sacrifice" (Santana, Rolie, Brown, Malone)
 "Incident at Neshabur" (Gianquinto, Santana)
 "Oye Como Va" (Tito Puente)
 "She's Not There" (Rod Argent)
 "Transcendance" (Santana)
 "I Want You" (Ross, Ware)
 "Evil Ways" (Henry)

Tour dates

Australian leg (October 1–10)

Japanese leg (October 16–25)

U.S. leg (October 28 – December 2)

Box office score data

Notes

References 
Citations

Bibliography

External links 

1960s
1960s-related lists
1970s-related lists
Santana